34 Hours is a 1971 album by Irish blues-rock band Skid Row. It was the band's second album, and takes its title from the fact that it was recorded in 34 hours.

Track listing
Side I
"Night of the Warm Witch" (Brendan "Brush" Shiels, Gary Moore, Noel "Nollaig" Bridgeman) – 9:04
 including "The Following Morning"
"First Thing in the Morning" (Shiels, Moore, Bridgeman) – 1:55
 including "Last Thing at Night"
"Mar" (Shiels) – 6:33

Side II
"Go, I'm Never Gonna Let You, Pt. 1" (Shiels) – 8:50
 including "Go, I'm Never Gonna Let You, Pt.2"
"Lonesome Still" (Shiels, Moore, Bridgeman) – 3:50
"Love Story, Pt. 1" (Shiels, Moore, Bridgeman) – 5:07
 including "Love Story, Pt. 2"
 including "Love Story, Pt. 3"
 including "Love Story, Pt. 4"

Personnel
Skid Row
Brush Shiels – lead vocals, bass guitar, guitar
Gary Moore – lead guitar, vocals
Noel Bridgeman – drums, background vocals

Additional musicians 
Paul Scully – bass guitar on "Mar"

Production
Clifford Davis – producer
Martin Birch – engineer

References 

1971 albums
Skid Row (Irish band) albums
Epic Records albums
CBS Records albums